Liu Long may refer to:

 Liu Long (Yuanbo) (劉隆; died 57), style name Yuanbo (元伯), Eastern Han Dynasty general, see Book of the Later Han
 Emperor Shang of Han (105-106), name Liu Long (劉隆), Eastern Han Dynasty emperor